Cornisepta crossei is a species of sea snail, a marine gastropod mollusk in the family Fissurellidae, the keyhole limpets.

Description
The shell grows to a height of 3 mm.

Distribution
This species occurs in the Atlantic Ocean off the Azores.

References

Fissurellidae
Gastropods described in 1896